Baulch may refer to:

People
 Crosbie Baulch (born 1959), Australian Olympic canoeist 
 Douglas Baulch (1917–1996), Australian artist 
 Jamie Baulch (born 1973), British Olympic sprinter

Places
 Baulch Peak, Antarctic mountain